Nerina Montagnani (20 April 1897 – 4 November 1993) was an Italian actress.

Life and career 
Born in Maranello, Modena, Montagnani graduated as a teacher. Starting in 1918 she worked as a governess and a gardener in many noble houses in France and Italy.  At 68 years old, while working at the Palazzo Barberini as a gardener, she was discovered by Federico Fellini who gave her supporting roles in Giulietta degli spiriti, Satyricon and The Clowns.  From then, for about 25 years, Montagnani appeared in dozens of films and stage works.  She obtained a large popularity with the role of Natalina, Nino Manfredi's chambermaid in a long series of Lavazza commercials shot between 1979 and 1990. 

She died of bronchopneumonia at 96 years old.

References

External links 

People from the Province of Modena
Italian stage actresses
Italian film actresses
1897 births
1993 deaths
20th-century Italian actresses
Deaths from pneumonia in Emilia-Romagna
Deaths from bronchopneumonia